Flannel panel is a humorous term for a magazine masthead panel that lists publisher and staff details.

The origin of the term is unknown, but according to the Oxford English Dictionary, one definition of "flannel" is: "Nonsense, ‘hot air’; flattery, unnecessary ostentation." Thus, the origin of the term likely comes from the perception that journalists are full of hot air and nonsense.

Short-lived UK computing magazine Amiga Power points out: "It [flannel panel] is, of course, merely the list of credits at the beginning of a magazine, but, like all jargon, given a stupid elevating name so people who work in a particular industry can feel superior to people who don't."

Publishing

fi:Apinalaatikko